Rubramoena amoena is a species of sea slug, an aeolid nudibranch, a marine gastropod mollusc in the family Fionidae.

Distribution
This species was described from Torbay, Devon, England. It has been reported from the NE Atlantic from Orkney south to Portugal and in the Mediterranean Sea.

Description 
The typical adult size of this species is 5–12 mm.

Habitat 
Rubramoena amoena feeds on hydroids of the genus Halecium.

References 

Fionidae
Gastropods described in 1845